Arkansas Heritage Trails System is a network of four historic trails within the state of Arkansas. The heritage trails system was established by the Arkansas General Assembly on March 31, 2009. Roadways included in the system are Arkansas Department of Transportation (ArDOT) as well as county roads. The program emphasizes cooperation among the Arkansas Department of Heritage, the Department of Parks and Tourism, and the Department of Transportation.

Butterfield Trail

Memphis to Fort Smith Route (with two separate routes through Little Rock)
Fort Smith to Missouri Route

Southwest Trail

Southwest Trail Route

Trail of Tears

Bell Route
Benge Route
Northern Route
Seminole Route
Chickasaw Route
Muscogee Route
Choctaw Route

Civil War Trail

Cabell's Route to Fayetteville
Camden Expedition Route
Confederate Approaches to Helena
Fagan's Approach Route
Marmaduke's Approach Route
Price, McRae and Parson's Approach Route
Walker's Approach Route
Confederate Approaches to Pine Bluff
Monroe and Thompson's Approach Route
Newton's Approach Route
Greene's Approach Route
Little Rock Campaign
Steele's Approach Route
Davidson's Approach Route
Pea Ridge Campaign
Confederate Advance Route
Sigel's Retreat Route
Ford Road Route
Bentonville Detour Route
Telegraph Road Route
Confederate Retreat Route, Alvin Seamster Road between Elkhorn Tavern and US 62
Curtis's Movements Route
Steele's Movements Route
Prairie Grove Campaign Route
Hindman's Approach Route
Herron's Approach Route
Blunt's Approach Route
Price Raid Route

See also
Historic trails and roads in the United States

References

External links

 Government

Historic Routes & Heritage Trails at Arkansas Department of Parks and Tourism
 General information
Arkansas Heritage Trails System at Encyclopedia of Arkansas History & Culture

 
2009 establishments in Arkansas
Trail of Tears